Karangsari is a village in Pulosari District, Pemalang Regency in Central Java Province. Its population is 5015.

Climate
Karangsari has a subtropical highland climate (Cfb). It has moderate rainfall from June to September and heavy to very heavy rainfall from October to May.

References

Villages in Central Java